is a former Korean province, one of the administrative divisions of Korea under Japanese rule, with its capital at Shunsen (present day Chuncheon, South Korea). The province consisted of what are now the Kangwon and Gangwon provinces of North Korea and South Korea respectively.

Population

Number of people by nationality according to the 1936 census:

 Overall population: 1,529,071 people
 Japanese: 15,019 people
 Koreans: 1,513,276 people
 Other: 776 people

Administrative divisions

The following list is based on the administrative divisions of 1945:

Counties 

 Shunsen (春川) - (capital): Chuncheon (춘천).
 Rintei (麟蹄): Inje (인제).
 Yōkō (楊口): Yanggu (양구).
 Waiyō (淮陽): Hoeyang (회양).
 Tsūsen (通川): Tongcheon (통천).
 Kōjō (高城): Goseong (고성).
 Jōyō (襄陽): Yangyang (양양).
 Kōryō (江陵): Gangneung (강릉).
 Sanchoku (三陟): Samcheok (삼척).
 Utchin (蔚珍): Uljin (울진). present Uljin County in North Gyeongsang Province.
 Seizen (旌善): Jeongseon (정선).
 Heishō (平昌): Pyeongchang (평창).
 Neietsu (寧越): Yeongwol (영월).
 Genshū (原州): Wonju (원주).
 Ōjō (橫城): Hoengseong (횡성).
 Kōsen (洪川): Hongcheon (홍천).
 Kasen (華川): Hwacheon (화천).
 Kinka (金化): Gimhwa (김화).
 Tetsugen (鐵原): Cheorwon (철원).
 Heikō (平康): Pyeonggang (평강).
 Isen (伊川): Icheon (이천).

Provincial governors

The following people were provincial ministers before August 1919. This was then changed to the title of governor.

See also
Provinces of Korea
Governor-General of Chōsen
Administrative divisions of Korea
Gangwon (historical province)
Gangwon Province (South Korea)
Kangwon Province (North Korea)

Notes

References

Korea under Japanese rule
Former prefectures of Japan in Korea